Canala  is a commune in the North Province of New Caledonia, an overseas territory of France in the Pacific Ocean.

History
On 25 April 1995 about 47% of the territory of Canala was detached and became the commune of Kouaoua.

References

Communes of New Caledonia